The Morals of Marcus Ordeyne or The Morals of Marcus may refer to:

 The Morals of Marcus Ordeyne (novel), a 1905 novel by William John Locke
 The Morals of Marcus Ordeyne (play), a 1906 play based on the novel
 Morals (film), a 1921 film adaptation
 The Morals of Marcus (1915 film), a lost American silent comedy-drama film, based on the novel
 The Morals of Marcus (1935 film), a British comedy film, based on the novel